The Ford Nunataks are a cluster of nunataks and low peaks rising above a network of ice-drowned ridges about  in extent, lying  northwest of Murtaugh Peak in the Wisconsin Range of the Horlick Mountains, Antarctica. They were mapped by the United States Geological Survey from surveys and U.S. Navy air photos, 1960–64, and were named by the Advisory Committee on Antarctic Names for Franklin E. Ford, a construction mechanic with the winter parties at  the Byrd Station in 1961 and then the South Pole Station in 1965.

References 

Nunataks of Marie Byrd Land